Charlie Blackwell-Thompson is an American engineer. Blackwell-Thompson is the launch director for NASA's Exploration Ground Systems Program, based at NASA's John F. Kennedy Space Center (KSC). She oversaw the countdown and liftoff of NASA's Space Launch System (SLS) rocket and Orion spacecraft during its first flight test, called Artemis I.

Personal life and education 
Blackwell-Thompson is a native of Gaffney, South Carolina, where she graduated from Gaffney High School. 

As a child, Blackwell-Thompson watched the Saturn V launches and was inspired by the idea of exploration the astronauts were doing. Blackwell-Thompson earned her bachelor's degree of computer engineering from Clemson University in 1988. She credits her high school physics teacher, Doc Wilson, for encouraging her to look into engineering. Blackwell-Thompson visited a firing room in the Launch Control Center during her senior year at Clemson during her job interview; she wanted to work in that room.

Blackwell-Thompson resides in Merritt Island, Florida, with her husband and three children.

Career 

In 1988 she joined The Boeing Company as a payload flight software engineer at NASA KSC. She also worked as the lead in the Electrical Integration Office and the ground operations integration lead engineer for the Orbital Space Plane.

Blackwell-Thompson began her NASA career in 2004 as a test director in the Launch and Landing Division. She served as the qualified tanking test director for multiple space shuttle missions. She served as the chief NASA test director from STS-130 until program completion. She also served as the assistant launch director for STS-133 and through numerous tanking tests. She served as the chief of Launch and Landing through the retirement of the Space Shuttle Program (SSP). Blackwell-Thompson worked on planning efforts for launch operations in the Constellation Program.

Exploration Ground Systems 
Following the Space Shuttle's retirement, Blackwell-Thompson served as the Ground Systems Development Office's Test Management Branch chief. She led an operations team that developed the plans, procedures and processes for integrated testing, launch and recovery operations.

In 2016 she was named Launch Director for SLS/Orion. She is the first woman to serve as a NASA launch director. 

On launch day, Blackwell-Thompson oversaw a launch team of 91 controllers, making the final determination for "GO." The team included veteran controllers from space shuttle processing and launches along with many newer engineers. She also leads a  Support Launch Team about 60 people in a second firing room. She expects 30% of her team to be women engineers.

In 2019, Blackwell-Thompson led the launch team in performing training simulations inside Firing Room 1 of the Launch Control Center. The exercises certify the team is ready for launch and can work through any type of issue in real-time. On February 3, 2020, Blackwell-Thompson led the Artemis I launch team through a countdown simulation in Firing Room 1 of the Launch Control Center. In November 2020 she led a cryogenic propellant loading simulation.

In March 2021, a year into the COVID-19 pandemic, Blackwell-Thompson led the first exercise with the supporting NASA centers and the flight control team joining launch control to simulate launch together. She will lead another 12 additional simulations in 2021 prior to launch day.

On November 16, 2022, she directed the successful launch of Artemis 1.

Patents 
Blackwell-Thompson holds multiple patents related to launch vehicle interface standardization concepts and command and control methods and systems.

External links 
 Kennedy Biographies - Charlie Blackwell-Thompson

References 

American women engineers
NASA people
Year of birth missing (living people)
Living people
21st-century women engineers
21st-century American women